This is the complete list of Asian Games medalists in volleyball from 1958 to 2018.

Volleyball

Men

Women

Nine-a-side volleyball

Men

Women

References

 Medalists from previous Asian Games – Men
 Medalists from previous Asian Games – Women

External links
Olympic Council of Asia

volleyball
medalists